Neuwiedenthal is a station on the Harburg S-Bahn line in Hamburg, Germany, and served by the trains of Hamburg S-Bahn lines S3 and S31. The station was opened in 1984 and is located in the Hamburg quarter of Hausbruch. Hausbruch is part of the Hamburg borough of Harburg.

History 
The station was opened in 1984 with the S3's extension to Neugraben.

Service 
The lines S3 and S31 of Hamburg S-Bahn call at Neuwiedenthal station.

Gallery

See also 

 Hamburger Verkehrsverbund (HVV)
 List of Hamburg S-Bahn stations

References

External links 

 Line and route network plans at hvv.de 

Hamburg S-Bahn stations in Hamburg
Buildings and structures in Harburg, Hamburg
Railway stations in Germany opened in 1984
1984 establishments in West Germany